Arnold Davison Blyth (22 November 1856 – 14 March 1917) was a Scottish amateur golfer. Blyth tied for tenth place along with James Braid in the 1894 Open Championship.

Early life
Blyth was born in Scotland in 1856.

Golf career
Blyth tied for tenth place along with James Braid in the 1894 Open Championship.

1894 Open Championship
The 1894 Open Championship was the 34th Open Championship, held 11–12 June at Royal St George's Golf Club in Sandwich, England. J.H. Taylor won the Championship by five strokes from runner-up Douglas Rolland. This was the first Open Championship held outside Scotland.

Details of play
The players had to battle heavy winds in the first round and the scoring suffered as a result. Blyth—along with most of the field—was victimized by the swirling winds, firing a disappointing 91. However, he regained his composure and scored significantly better in the final three rounds. His round-by-round results were as follows: 91-84-84-82=341.

Team appearances
England–Scotland Amateur Match (representing Scotland): 1904 (winners)

References

Scottish male golfers
Amateur golfers
Golfers from St Andrews
1856 births
1917 deaths